Chardon Lagache is a station on the Paris Métro in the 16th arrondissement, serving line 10 (eastbound only). It is named after the nearby rue Chardon Lagache, which was named after a local retirement home. It is one of the few métro stations to have been named after a woman, after Bagneux–Lucie Aubrac, Barbara, Barbès–Rochechouart, Boucicaut, Louise Michel, Madeleine, and Pierre et Marie Curie.

History 
The station opened on 30 September 1913 as part of the extension of line 8 from Charles Michels (then known as Beaugrenelle ) to Porte d'Auteuil. On 27 July 1937, the section of line 8 between La Motte-Picquet–Grenelle and Porte d'Auteuil, including Michel-Ange–Molitor was transferred to line 10 during the reconfiguration of lines 8, 10, and the old line 14. However, service between Porte d'Auteuil and Jussieu was not provided until two days later, on July 29, with service initially limited to La Motte-Picquet-Grenelle. Line 10 was also extended from Duroc to La Motte-Picquet–Grenelle on the same day.

As part of the "Renouveau du métro" programme by the RATP, the station's corridors was renovated and modernised on 18 May 2006.

In 2019, the station was used by 692,665 passengers, making it the 295th busiest of the Métro network out of 302 stations.

In 2020, the station was used by 331,901 passengers amidst the COVID-19 pandemic, making it the 295th busiest of the Métro network out of 305 stations.

In 2021, the station was used by 482,053 passengers, making it the 296th busiest of the Métro network out of 305 stations.

Passenger services

Access 
The station has a single Guimard entrance, rue Chardon Lagache Hôpital Sainte-Périne. It was listed as a historical monument on 12 February 2016. The corridors from the entrance to the mezzanine are unusually adorned with green ceramic friezes, typically seen on métro stations built by the Nord-Sud Company.

Station layout

Platform 
The station has a single curved side platform with a single tracks, only serving trains towards Gare d'Austerlitz.

Other connections 
The station is also served by lines 22 and 62 of the RATP bus network, and at night, by lines N12 and N61 of the Noctilien network.

Gallery

References

Roland, Gérard (2003). Stations de métro. D’Abbesses à Wagram. Éditions Bonneton.

Paris Métro stations in the 16th arrondissement of Paris
Railway stations in France opened in 1913